Šok i nevjerica is the eleventh studio album by Bosnian rock band Zabranjeno Pušenje, released through Tropik in Bosnia and Herzegovina and Menart in Croatia and Serbia, on October 31, 2018.

Recording and production 
In 2017 and early 2018, the band recorded fourteen new songs in the Plavi Film studio in Zagreb, Croatia. The arrangement of all songs on the album was jointly signed by all members of the group. The song "Kupi nas Ali" was recorded with Bosnian rapper Sassja, while the song "Svjetla Sarajeva" was recorded with Damir Imamović, Bosnian singer and composer of Bosnian folk music.

Release and promotion 
On December 11, 2017, the band released a music video on its YouTube channel for the first single from the album, "Nova godina". Music videos for "Kupi nas Ali" and "Irska" followed. On October 19, 2018, the band released the video on its YouTube channel for the second single, "Irska".

Track listing 
Source: ZAMP

Personnel 

Zabranjeno pušenje
Sejo Sexon – lead vocals, backing vocals
Toni Lović – electric guitar, acoustic guitar
Branko Trajkov Trak – drums, percussion, backing vocals
Robert Boldižar – violin, cello, keyboards, backing vocals
Dejan Orešković Klo – bass
Lana Škrgatić – keyboards, saxophone, flute, backing vocals

Additional musicians
 Sanela Halilović "Sassja" – vocals (track 2)
 Damir Imamović – tambur, vocals (track 1)

Production
 Sejo Sexon – production, arrangement
 Toni Lović – programming, sound engineering, audio mixing, production, arrangement
 Dejan Orešković – mastering, programming, sound engineering, audio mixing, arrangement
 Đani Pervan – programming, sound engineering, audio mixing
 Dario Vitez – executive production
 Robert Boldižar – arrangement
 Branko Trajkov – arrangement
 Lana Škrgatić – arrangement

Design
Ideologija (design studio in Sarajevo, BH) – design and layout
Saša Midžor Sučić – photos

References

2018 albums
Zabranjeno Pušenje albums